Demirel is a Turkish surname meaning "iron hand." Notable people with the surname include:
Bektaş Demirel (born 1976), Turkish judoka
Hakan Demirel (born 1986), Turkish basketball player
Mithat Demirel (born 1978), Turkish-German basketball player
Nazmiye Demirel (1927–2013), First Lady of Turkey
 Serdar Demirel (born 1983), Turkish sport shooter
Süleyman Demirel (1924–2015), Turkish politician, former prime minister and state president
Volkan Demirel (born 1981), Turkish football goalkeeper
Yeşim Demirel (born 1990), Turkish-German women's footballer
Çağlar Demirel (born 1969) Kurdish politician from Turkey

Turkish-language surnames
Surnames from nicknames